Russell Hardin (1940–24 February 2017) was an American political scientist. He is known for his works on collective action and trust. He earned his PhD at the Massachusetts Institute of Technology in 1971. At the time of his death, he was a professor in the New York University Department of Politics. In 1990, he was elected fellow of the American Academy of Arts and Sciences.

References

American political scientists
1940 births
2017 deaths
Fellows of the American Academy of Arts and Sciences